Onika Tanya Maraj-Petty (born December 8, 1982), known professionally as Nicki Minaj, is a Trinidadian-born rapper, singer, songwriter and actress. She is known for her musical versatility, animated flow in her rapping, alter egos and accents. Minaj first gained recognition after releasing three mixtapes between 2007 and 2009. Her debut album, Pink Friday (2010), topped the U.S. Billboard 200 chart. Its fifth single, "Super Bass", reached number three on the U.S. Billboard Hot 100 chart and was certified diamond by the RIAA. Minaj's follow-up album, Pink Friday: Roman Reloaded (2012) explored dance-pop. The lead single, "Starships", peaked in the top five worldwide.

Her third album, The Pinkprint (2014) explored more personal topics and marked a return to her hip hop roots. Its second single, "Anaconda" peaked at number two on the Hot 100 and became the first music video by a solo female rapper to reach one billion views on YouTube. She released her fourth album, Queen, in 2018 and it spawned the U.S. top ten single "Chun-Li". In 2019, her collaboration with Karol G, "Tusa", became the longest-running number-one single on the Argentina Hot 100 chart. Minaj achieved her first two Hot 100 number-one singles in 2020, "Trollz" and "Say So" and her third with the lead single of her forthcoming fifth studio album, "Super Freaky Girl". It became the first solo song by a female rapper to debut at number one in the U.S. since 1998.

Referred to as the "Queen of Rap", Minaj is one of the best-selling music artists, with more than 100 million records sold worldwide. Billboard ranked her as the top selling female rapper of the 2010s. She became the first female artist to have one hundred Billboard Hot 100 entries and has twenty one top 10 hits on the Hot 100, the most for any female rapper. Her various accolades include eight American Music Awards, five MTV Video Music Awards (including the 2022 Michael Jackson Video Vanguard Award), twelve BET Awards, four Billboard Music Awards, a Brit Award and three Guinness World Records. Outside of music, her film career has included voice roles in the animated films Ice Age: Continental Drift (2012) and The Angry Birds Movie 2 (2019) as well as supporting roles in the films The Other Woman (2014) and Barbershop: The Next Cut (2016). In 2016, Time included her on their annual list of the 100 most influential people in the world.  Throughout her career, Minaj's outspoken views and social media disputes have received significant media coverage.

Life and career

1982–2003: Early life and childhood 

Onika Tanya Maraj was born on December 8, 1982, in the Saint James district of Port of Spain, Trinidad and Tobago. Her father was Robert Maraj (1956–2021), a financial executive and part-time gospel singer of Dougla (Afro-Trinidadian mother and Indo-Trinidadian father) descent. Her mother, Carol Maraj, is also a gospel singer with Afro-Trinidadian ancestry. Carol worked in payroll and accounting departments during Minaj's youth. Minaj's father was addicted to alcohol and crack cocaine and had a violent temper, burning down their house in December 1987. She has an older brother named Jelani, a younger brother named Micaiah, and a younger sister named Ming.

As a child, Minaj and her older brother, Jelani, grew up with her grandmother in Saint James in a household with 11 cousins. Minaj's mother, Carol Maraj, was working numerous jobs in Saint James before getting her green card at the age of 24. She then moved to the Bronx in New York City to attend Monroe College, leaving both Minaj and Jelani in Trinidad with their grandmother. Eventually, when Minaj was five, Carol got her first house, on 147th Street in South Jamaica, Queens and brought both Minaj and Jelani to live with her and their father. Minaj recalled, "I don't think I had a lot of discipline in my household. My mom motivated me, but it wasn't a strict household. I kind of wanted a strict household."  Minaj successfully auditioned for admission to Fiorello H. LaGuardia High School of Music & Art and Performing Arts, which focuses on visual and performing arts. After graduation, Minaj wanted to become an actress, and she was cast in the Off-Broadway play In Case You Forget in 2001.

Minaj has revealed that she had an abortion as a teenager in her songs "All Things Go" and "Autobiography". She has said that although it has "haunted" her, she stands by her decision. At the age of 19, as she struggled with her acting career, she worked as a waitress at a Red Lobster in the Bronx, but was fired for discourtesy to customers. She said she was fired from "at least 15 jobs" for similar reasons. Other jobs included customer service representative and office management on Wall Street. Minaj recalls buying a BMW as a 19-year-old with the money from waitressing.

2004–2009: Career beginnings and mixtapes 

Minaj briefly signed with Brooklyn group Full Force, in which she rapped in a quartet called The Hoodstars composed of Lou$tar (son of "Bowlegged Lou"), Safaree Samuels (Scaff Beezy) and 7even Up. In 2004, the group recorded the entrance song for WWE Diva Victoria, "Don't Mess With", which was featured on the compilation album ThemeAddict: WWE The Music, Vol.6. Minaj later left Full Force and uploaded songs on her Myspace profile, sending several of her songs to people in the music industry. Later, Fendi, CEO of Brooklyn label Dirty Money Entertainment, signed Minaj to his label in 2007 under a 180-day contract. Originally adopting the stage name Nicki Maraj, she eventually changed it to Nicki Minaj stating that "my real name is Maraj. Fendi flipped it when he met me because I had such a nasty flow!"

Minaj released her first mixtape, Playtime Is Over, on July 5, 2007, and her second, Sucka Free, on April 12, 2008. She released her third mixtape, Beam Me Up Scotty, on April 18, 2009; it received favorable coverage on BET and MTV. At the time, she was managed by Debra Antney. One of its tracks, "I Get Crazy", reached number 20 on the U.S. Billboard Hot Rap Songs chart and number 37 on the Hot R&B/Hip-Hop Songs chart. After Minaj was discovered by fellow rapper Lil Wayne, she signed a recording contract with his Young Money Entertainment. That November, she appeared with Gucci Mane and Trina on the remix of "5 Star Bitch" by Yo Gotti.

In early February 2010, Minaj made her first two appearances on the U.S Billboard Hot 100 chart with her features on "Knockout" and "Up Out My Face" by Lil Wayne and Mariah Carey respectively. Minaj also appeared on "BedRock" and "Roger That" on the compilation album, We Are Young Money (2009). The singles peaked at numbers two and 56, respectively, in the U.S. Their parent album reached number nine on the U.S. Billboard 200, and was certified gold by the Recording Industry Association of America (RIAA). At Jay-Z's suggestion, Robin Thicke featured Minaj on his single "Shakin' It 4 Daddy". Allison Stewart of The Washington Post stated that, during that time, she "became the go-to girl for artists who wanted to add some skank to their tracks without sullying themselves in the process". Minaj became the first female solo artist to have seven singles simultaneously charting in the U.S.

2010–2011: Breakthrough with Pink Friday 

On March 29, 2010, Minaj released "Massive Attack" featuring Sean Garrett. Intended as the lead single from her forthcoming debut album, Pink Friday, the song was dropped from the album due to poor commercial performance. The next single, "Your Love", later became the album's lead single. Released in June, it peaked at number 14 on the U.S. Billboard Hot 100 and number one on the Rap Songs chart. In September, Minaj released "Check It Out" featuring will.i.am and "Right Thru Me" as follow-up singles.

In October, Minaj was featured on Kanye West's "Monster", a posse cut with Jay-Z and Rick Ross featuring vocals from Justin Vernon of Bon Iver. Her verse received widespread acclaim with many critics regarding it as the best verse on that song. Complex rated Minaj's "Monster" verse as the number-one best rap verse in the past five years, while Sean Fennessey of The Village Voice stated that "Monster" was "the track that announced Minaj's "brilliance" to most people." Shortly after, she performed "Monster" with West and Jay-Z at Yankee Stadium, becoming the first ever female rapper to perform there. In November 2010, Minaj received her first Grammy Award nomination for her guest verse on Ludacris' song "My Chick Bad".

Pink Friday was released on November 19, 2010, debuting at number two and later reaching number one on the Billboard 200, with first-week sales of 375,000 copies. It had the highest sales week for a female rap album this century and second highest sales week overall after Lauryn Hill's The Miseducation of Lauryn Hill (1998). Upon release, the album received generally positive reviews from critics. The album was certified platinum in December, with it becoming the first album by a solo female rapper to go platinum in seven years. "Moment 4 Life" featuring Drake was released as the fourth single from Pink Friday shortly after the album's release. The song served as the third single off the album, released as a single on December 7, 2010. Minaj performed "Right Thru Me" and "Moment 4 Life" as the musical guest on the January 29, 2011, episode of Saturday Night Live.

"Super Bass", the album's fifth single, was released in April 2011. It became a sleeper hit and commercially successful, ultimately peaking at number three in the U.S. and was eventually certified octuple-platinum in the U.S. Super Bass was the highest charting solo single by a female rapper since Missy Elliott's "Work It" in 2002. The music video has 925 million views on YouTube as of March 2022. Early in her career, Minaj identified as bisexual and made several references to it in her music. However, she eventually stated in a 2010 Rolling Stone interview, "I think girls are sexy, but I'm not going to lie and say that I date girls." She once again addressed her sexuality in 2020 on Doja Cat's "Say So" remix. The lyrics divided members of the LGBT community, with some accusing her of "bisexual erasure" while others voicing there is nothing wrong with originally identifying as bisexual, and then later identifying as straight.

Minaj was one of the opening acts on Britney Spears' 2011 Femme Fatale Tour. She and Kesha appeared on the remix of Spears' "Till the World Ends", which peaked at number three in the U.S. On August 7, 2011, Nicki experienced a wardrobe malfunction during a live performance on Good Morning America when she revealed her left nipple. Both ABC and Minaj apologized for the incident, with Minaj denying it was a publicity stunt. Minaj continued to perform at high-profile events throughout 2011 with Donatella Versace inviting her to perform with Prince for the introduction of a Versace collection for H&M. She also performed "Super Bass" at the 2011 Victoria's Secret Fashion Show. In July 2011, her cousin Nicholas Telemaque was murdered near his home in Brooklyn, an incident she later references in her songs "All Things Go" and "Champion". In December 2011, Minaj was nominated for three Grammy Awards, including Best New Artist and Best Rap Album for Pink Friday. Also that year, she won the MTV Video Music Award for Best Hip-Hop Video for "Super Bass", marking her first VMA win.

2012–2013: Pink Friday: Roman Reloaded and American Idol 

"Starships" was released in February 2012 as the lead single from Minaj's forthcoming second album Pink Friday: Roman Reloaded. The song reached number five on the U.S. Billboard Hot 100, and went on to become the fifth best-selling single of 2012. Her crossover into pop music was criticized by some, despite her commercial success. Follow-up singles "Beez in the Trap" featuring 2 Chainz and "Right by My Side" featuring Chris Brown were released shortly after.

Pink Friday: Roman Reloaded was eventually released on April 2, 2012, two months later than initially planned. The album was preceded by the promotional singles "Roman in Moscow" and "Stupid Hoe". The album debuted at number one on the Billboard 200, with first-week sales of 253,000 copies, and was certified platinum by the RIAA in June 2012. However, the mix of hip-hop songs and mainstream pop material received mixed reviews. "Pound the Alarm" and "Va Va Voom" were later released as the final singles from the album. Minaj along with fellow rapper M.I.A. joined Madonna to perform the single, "Give Me All Your Luvin" during the Super Bowl XLVI halftime show on February 6, 2012. Minaj was the first solo female rapper to perform at the Grammy Awards, performing "Roman Holiday" during the 2012 ceremony on February 12. Her exorcism-themed performance was controversial, with the American Catholic League and its president criticizing her performance.

Minaj began her headlining Pink Friday Tour on May 16, 2012, which was followed by the Pink Friday: Reloaded Tour beginning October 14, 2012. Although she was scheduled to headline the June 3 Hot 97 Summer Jam at MetLife Stadium in New Jersey, at the request of Lil Wayne she canceled her appearance the day of the show after Peter Rosenberg of the station dismissed her single "Starships" as "not real hip-hop". The following month, she voiced Steffie in the animated film Ice Age: Continental Drift (2012). Minaj won awards for Best Female Video (for "Starships") at the 2012 MTV Video Music Awards and Best Hip-Hop at the 2012 MTV Europe Music Awards.

An expanded version of Pink Friday: Roman Reloaded, subtitled The Re-Up, was released on November 19, 2012, with seven new songs. That month, she was the subject of a three-part E! documentary titled Nicki Minaj: My Truth. In September, Minaj joined the judges' panel for the twelfth season of American Idol with Mariah Carey, Keith Urban, and Randy Jackson. Throughout the show there were disagreements between Carey and Minaj, with both of them leaving the series at the end of the season.

2014–2017: The Pinkprint and acting ventures 

Minaj's first live-action theatrical film The Other Woman was filmed in spring 2013 and premiered on April 25, 2014. In late 2014, Minaj separated from her longtime boyfriend Safaree Samuels, whom she had dated since 2003. According to Minaj, he had proposed to her, but she declined. Several tracks on her forthcoming third album, The Pinkprint, are believed to have been heavily inspired by the end of their relationship. Minaj began dating rapper Meek Mill in early 2015, shortly after her breakup with Samuels. As she was working on The Pinkprint, she described the album as "a continuation of The Re-Up with a lot more" and said it would focus on her "hip hop roots". During an MTV interview, she additionally said that it would be "next level" and that she has "much to talk about".

"Pills n Potions" was released as the lead single from The Pinkprint in May 2014. In July, she appeared as a featured artist on the song "Bang Bang" with singers Jessie J and Ariana Grande, which peaked at number three on the U.S. Billboard Hot 100 chart. "Anaconda" was released in August as the second single from the album, peaking at number two, which became her highest-charting single in the U.S. at the time. The music video for "Anaconda" went viral upon release online; it set a 24-hour Vevo record, accumulating 19.6 million views on its first day of release, breaking the record previously held by Miley Cyrus for "Wrecking Ball". On November 9, 2014, Minaj hosted the 2014 MTV Europe Music Awards in Glasgow, Scotland. She also won the Best Hip-Hop Award for a second time. The Pinkprint was officially released on December 15, 2014, and debuted at number two in the U.S, with first week sales of 244,000 equivalent units (198,000 in pure album sales and 46,000 combined album-equivalent units and streams). Upon release, critics praised the production and personal lyrics.

At the 58th Grammy Awards, Minaj received three more Grammy Award nominations, including a second Best Rap Album nomination for The Pinkprint, a Best Rap Song nomination for "Anaconda" and a Best Pop Duo/Group Performance nomination for "Bang Bang". In March 2015, Minaj embarked on her third world tour entitled The Pinkprint Tour and also became the first female artist to chart four songs simultaneously in the top 10 of Billboards Mainstream R&B/Hip-Hop airplay chart. At the 2015 BET Awards, Minaj won her sixth consecutive award for Best Female Hip-Hop Artist, becoming the female rapper with most wins in that category. In August 2015, Madame Tussauds unveiled a wax figure of Minaj, which depicted a pose from the "Anaconda" music video. The attraction received criticism from some, including Angharad Welsh of The Independent, who called it "a sexist, racist mistake". Despite this, Minaj voiced her approval of the wax figure on social media.

In May 2015, it was announced that Minaj would feature in the third installment of the Barbershop film series, alongside Ice Cube, Cedric the Entertainer, Eve, and other original cast members. Titled Barbershop: The Next Cut, the film was released on April 15, 2016. For Minaj's performance as a "sassy" hairdresser named Draya, she was nominated for a Teen Choice Award for Choice Movie Actress: Comedy. In September 2015, it was announced that Minaj would executive produce and appear in a scripted single-camera comedy series for ABC Family (now Freeform) based on her life growing up in Queens, New York City. The show was titled Nicki and the pilot episode was filmed in Minaj's hometown in January 2016. In October 2016, Minaj stated the filming was postponed for undisclosed reasons.

In February 2017, Minaj was featured on Jason Derulo's single "Swalla" which reached the top ten in several countries, including a peak of number six in the UK. The following month, Minaj signed with the major modeling agency, Wilhelmina Models. On March 20, 2017, when her singles "No Frauds", "Changed It", and "Regret in Your Tears" were released simultaneously, Minaj broke the record for the most Billboard Hot 100 entries for a female artist, which at the time was previously held by Aretha Franklin. In May 2017, Minaj opened the 2017 Billboard Music Awards with a medley performance that was described by Elias Leight of Rolling Stone as "flamboyantly produced" and "dexterous". 

Throughout the remainder of 2017, Minaj performed guest verses on several singles, including Migos' "MotorSport" and Yo Gotti's "Rake It Up", both of which peaked inside the top ten in the U.S. at numbers six and eight, respectively. She also featured on Katy Perry's "Swish Swish", which was certified platinum in the US and Canada. In January 2017, she announced that she had ended her relationship with Meek Mill. Shortly after, she briefly dated fellow rapper Nas in 2017 before they broke up in January 2018.

2018–2019: Queen and marriage 

After a social media hiatus, Minaj released two singles from her fourth studio album Queen. She released "Chun-Li" and "Barbie Tingz" simultaneously on April 12, 2018, with both reaching number ten and number twenty-five in the U.S. respectively. She performed "Chun-Li" on Saturday Night Live and the 2018 BET Awards. While "Chun Li" appears on the tracklist of the album, "Barbie Tingz" is only included on the Target version of the album. On the red carpet of the 2018 Met Gala, she announced the title of the album and the original release date. The second single, "Bed", featuring Ariana Grande was released on June 14, 2018, alongside the album pre-order, reaching number 42 on the Hot 100. Additionally, Minaj appeared as a featured artist on the song "Fefe" along with Murda Beatz and Tekashi 6ix9ine. It debuted at number four in the U.S, marking Minaj's highest debut on the chart at the time, besting the sixth place start of "Bang Bang" in 2014. It later peaked at number three and was added to Queen in the middle of its first tracking week. The day before the album's release, Minaj launched her own Beats 1 radio show, Queen Radio.

Queen received multiple delays before being released on August 10, 2018. It debuted at number two on the US Billboard 200 with 185,000 album-equivalent units, of which 78,000 came from pure album sales. It debuted at number five in the UK and at number four in Australia, marking Minaj's highest debut in the latter country. Minaj later expressed frustration and criticized several people including Travis Scott, whose album Astroworld claimed the top spot for a second week in a row, blocking Queen from the top spot. Minaj alleged that Travis Scott sold shirts, merchandise, and ticket passes for an unnannounced tour to boost his album sales. This controversy and Queen roll-out was documented by several news outlets and commentators. Queen received generally positive reviews, with some critics deriding the album's length and direction. The album was certified Platinum by the RIAA in January 2019, for moving over 1 million equivalent units.

Minaj performed at the 2018 MTV Video Music Awards where she also won her fourth MTV Video Music Award for the "Chun-Li" music video. The same month, she featured on the remix of "Idol" by South Korean boy band BTS. It debuted and peaked at number eleven in the U.S. which was the group's second highest charting song at the time. She also featured on the song "Woman Like Me" by British girl group Little Mix, which was released on October 12, 2018. A music video was shortly released after, with Minaj and Little Mix later performing the song together at the 2018 MTV Europe Music Awards. She was also featured on "Dip" by American rapper Tyga which reached number sixty-three in the U.S. making her the first female artist to have 100 entries on the Billboard Hot 100 chart. She later attended the year-end Billboard Women in Music event, receiving the Game Changer Award for the accomplishment.

In September, Minaj co-headlined the annual Made in America Festival and suffered another wardrobe malfunction when the front of her outfit fell open. In November, she was invited to the DWP music festival in China but did not perform due to problems with the company hosting the event. The next year in April 2019, Minaj made a surprise guest appearance at the 2019 Coachella Valley Music and Arts Festival during Ariana Grande's set where they performed their collaborations "Side to Side" and "Bang Bang". However, she experienced technical difficulties with her earpiece. Later that month, Minaj parted ways with her longtime management team after a mutual agreement, with American entertainment executive Irving Azoff serving as her new manager.

In June 2019, Minaj released a standalone single titled "Megatron" along with an accompanying music video. In the U.S, the song debuted at number twenty. A month later, she provided information on her upcoming fifth studio album, appearing on The Tonight Show Starring Jimmy Fallon, stating that "there's definitely a new album, of course." She featured on the song "Hot Girl Summer" alongside fellow female rapper Megan Thee Stallion in August 2019, which reached number eleven in the U.S. Minaj began dating her childhood friend Kenneth Petty (nicknamed "Zoo") in December 2018, and after less than a year of dating, filed for a marriage license in August 2019. She announced that they had officially married in October, hyphenating his last name to hers upon marriage. 

Minaj had a voice role as Pinky in The Angry Birds Movie 2, which was released in August 2019. In November, Minaj appeared on the Charlie's Angels: Original Motion Picture Soundtrack on the song "Bad To You", along with Ariana Grande and Normani, marking her sixth collaboration with Grande. Minaj also collaborated with Colombian singer Karol G on the song "Tusa", which was released to streaming platforms on November 7. The song reached forty-two in the U.S. and reached the top of many other charts including the "Hot Latin Songs" chart, which made it the first song with two lead female artists to debut in such position. "Tusa" later became the longest-running number one single in Argentina, spending five months on the top of the chart.

2020–2021: Motherhood, Beam Me Up Scotty re-release, and lawsuit 

In January 2020, Minaj was featured on "Nice to Meet Ya" by American singer-songwriter Meghan Trainor. The song is from the latter's third studio album, Treat Myself (2020). In February, she released a standalone song called "Yikes" as a promotional single. By the end of that month, Minaj appeared as a guest judge on the twelfth season's premiere of the reality television show RuPaul's Drag Race. In March, her husband Kenneth Petty was entered into the California Megan's Law database after he was charged for failing to register as a sex offender after he relocated to California. Petty had been convicted of attempted rape in New York and had served nearly four years in prison for it. For this new charge, he was sentenced to one year of house arrest and a fine of $55,000 USD in 2022.

In May, fellow rapper Doja Cat announced a collaboration with Minaj on two remixes of her song "Say So". The remix later debuted at number one on the U.S. Billboard Hot 100, becoming both Minaj and Doja Cat's first single to reach number one in the U.S. It became the all-female collaboration that had reached number one in the U.S. since "Fancy" by Australian rapper Iggy Azalea featuring English singer Charli XCX did it in 2014. It marked the first time that a song by two female rappers reached the top, for which Guinness World Records later gave them an award. A month later, she released a collaboration with 6ix9ine called "Trollz", which debuted at number one in the U.S. becoming Minaj's second number one single. This made Minaj the first female rapper to debut at number one on the Billboard Hot 100 since Lauryn Hill did so in 1998 with "Doo Wop (That Thing)". The song dropped to number 34 in its second week, at the time breaking the record for biggest fall from number one in the U.S.

In July, Minaj announced via Instagram that she was expecting her first child. She gave birth to a son on September 30, 2020, whom she refers to publicly as "Papa Bear". His real name is still unknown. She later collaborated with rappers ASAP Ferg and MadeinTYO on a song called "Move Ya Hips". Almost a month later, Minaj featured on rapper Ty Dolla Sign's track "Expensive". She continued to appear as a featured artist on several songs in late 2020, and released "What That Speed Bout!?" with producer Mike Will Made It and rapper YoungBoy Never Broke Again on November 6. On the 10th anniversary of her debut album Pink Friday (2010), Minaj announced a six-part docuseries about her, produced by Bron Studios and was originally said to premiere on HBO Max. However, in 2022, the streaming platform confirmed it dropped the still-unreleased project.

The next year in February 2021, Minaj's father, Robert Maraj, died while walking along a road on Long Island in a hit-and-run accident. Charles Polevich, a 70-year-old man, was charged as the suspect of Maraj's death. Polevich was arraigned and charged with two felonies, which were leaving scene of incident involving death of a person and tampering with or suppressing physical evidence. Three months later, she commented on her father's death in a letter, saying, "[..] it has been the most devastating loss of my life. I find myself wanting to call him all the time, more so now that he's gone. [...] May his soul rest in paradise. He was very loved & will be very missed."

In May 2021, Minaj released a reissue of her mixtape Beam Me Up Scotty (2009), including new songs previously unavailable on streaming services. The reissue debuted at number two on the U.S. Billboard 200, which gave it the highest debut for a female rap mixtape in the U.S. A song from the reissue, titled "Seeing Green" featuring fellow Young Money rappers Drake and Lil Wayne reached number twelve in the U.S. and appeared in the mid-year "Best Hip Hop Songs of 2021 (so far)" critics list by magazine HipHopDX. Minaj's verse on "Fractions" from the reissue appeared on the mid-year "Best Rap Verses of 2021 So Far" critics list from Complex. In July, Minaj collaborated with fellow rapper Bia on the remix of her song Whole Lotta Money. The remix appeared on several "Best Songs of the Year" lists from publications such as Rolling Stone and NPR.

In August, her husband's victim (named Jennifer Hough) filed a lawsuit against Minaj and Petty for alleged harassment and intimidation. She later gave an interview about the accusations on the daytime talk show The Real. While Minaj has not publicly commented on the lawsuit, she addressed the accusations in a case filing: "I never asked [Hough] to change her story, I never offered her any money in return for a statement, and I did not threaten her with any type of harm if she chose not to provide a statement." Hough later voluntarily dropped the case against Minaj, with her lawyers claiming "jurisdictional issues" and telling a judge that it was going to be refiled in California. Minaj's lawyer countered their claims, saying that the refiling was a "friviolous gambit to avoid sanctions" and that "their claims received an aggresive response." Hough's initial claim of refiling the case was in January 2022.

In September, Minaj collaborated with English singer-songwriter Elton John's fifth collaboration album The Lockdown Sessions (2021). She appeared on the song "Always Love You" with John and rapper Young Thug. Later that month, she split with her previous manager Irving Azoff and is now being managed by Wassim Slaiby, also known by his management company SALXCO, who is best known for managing The Weeknd and Doja Cat. Furthermore, English singer Jesy Nelson released her solo debut, called "Boyz", which Minaj features on. The song peaked at number four in the UK and number sixteen in Ireland. In October 2021, Minaj appeared as a surprise host for the season six reunion of the reality television show The Real Housewives of Potomac. In November 2021, her 2011 Pink Friday single "Super Bass" received a Diamond certification by the RIAA, making her the second solo female rapper to receive a diamond certification. Minaj won the Best Hip Hop award in the MTV Europe Music Awards 2021, becoming the sixth time she has won this award.

2022–present: Upcoming fifth studio album 

At the beginning of the year, after a social media hiatus, Minaj announced a song collaboration with rapper Lil Baby called "Do We Have a Problem?". The track was released on February 4, along with a music video that featured guest appearances from actors Joseph Sikora and Cory Hardrict. The video also contained a snippet of another Lil Baby collaboration titled "Bussin", which was officially released a week later, on February 11. "Do We Have a Problem?" debuted and peaked at number two on the U.S. Billboard Hot 100. It became Minaj's twentieth top ten entry in the U.S, extending her record as the female rapper with the most U.S. top ten singles. In a promotional Apple Music interview with DJ Zane Lowe, Minaj said her forthcoming fifth studio album is "coming very soon". She described it as "fun, gutta, and back to the basics". Her other ventures also include fronting the campaign for the "Heaven" Spring 2022 collection by Marc Jacobs, which launched on March 3.

In March, Minaj collaborated with fellow rapper Coi Leray on a song titled "Blick Blick", from the former's debut studio album, Trendsetter (2022). Prior to the song's release, she revealed that her verse was almost scrapped due to American rapper Benzino (who is also Coi Leray's father) leaking the collaboration. Later that month, she surprise-released the standalone single "We Go Up" featuring rapper Fivio Foreign. The drill track was initially teased on Minaj's social media as a scrapped song from her album, before fans had requested her to release the song. The next month, Minaj appeared on English television host James Corden's Carpool Karaoke segment, kickstarting its returning broadcast on The Late Late Show with James Corden after a two-year hiatus. After that, she was named the new creative director of American men's magazine Maxim and became the new global ambassador and advisor for MaximBet, a sports betting brand launched by Maxim. She also came along on board as a stakeholder.

In early July, Minaj did several live performances by headlining the 2022 Essence Music Festival in New Orleans and the 2022 Wireless Festival in London. The same month, she posted a snippet of a song on social media that samples American singer Rick James's 1981 song, "Super Freak." On July 22, she announced that the full track would be released on August 12. She revealed the song's title as "Super Freaky Girl" and the accompanying cover art for the song. On July 28, 2022, she released a two-minute trailer of her upcoming six-part docu-series titled "Nicki", produced by Canadian production company Bron Studios. After its initial release, "Super Freaky Girl" received an extended version called the "Roman Remix", which features the return of her alter ego Roman Zolanski. 

"Super Freaky Girl" debuted at number one in the U.S, making the song Minaj's third U.S. number one and her first unaccompanied number one. It became the first solo song by a female rapper to debut at number one in the U.S. in 22 years, after fellow rapper Lauryn Hill's song "Doo Wop (That Thing)" also debuted at number one in 1998. On August 28, 2022, Minaj released a compilation album called Queen Radio: Volume 1 with one new track, "Likkle Miss (Remix)" with Skeng. On September 9, 2022, Minaj released a remix of "Super Freaky Girl" called "Queen Mix", which features 5 other female rappers: JT, BIA, Katie Got Bandz, Akbar V, and Maliibu Miitch. 

On September 12, 2022, Yung Bleu released his single "Love in the Way" featuring Minaj with video released on September 19. On October 6, 2022, Minaj and Skeng released a remix of "Likkle Miss" called "THE FINE NINE REMIX" featuring Spice, Destra Garcia, Patrice Roberts, Lady Leshurr, Pamputtae, Dovey Magnum, Lisa Mercedez, and London Hill. On October 21, 2022, rapper YoungBoy Never Broke Again released a collaboration with Minaj titled "I Admit".

Artistry

Musical style 

Minaj is known for her animated rapping style and "unique" flow. Her rapping is distinctive for its speed and the use of alter egos and accents, primarily British cockney. She often both sings and raps in her songs, and has made use of metaphors, punch lines, and word play. The alter egos are incorporated with her lyrics in British accents (Roman Zolanski) or soft-spokenness (Harajuku Barbie). Ice-T said about Minaj's rapping style, "[Minaj] does her thing. She has her own way of doing it. She has an ill vocal delivery. She kind of reminds me of a female Busta Rhymes, like how she throws her voice in different directions."

Jon Caramanica of The New York Times called Minaj "a sparkling rapper with a gift for comic accents and unexpected turns of phrase. She's a walking exaggeration, outsize in sound, personality and look. And she's a rapid evolver, discarding old modes as easily as adopting new ones." Although many critics describe her technique as bubblegum rap, Minaj said: "What people don't know is that before I was doing that craziness I was doing me, I was just doing regular sounding rap that anyone could hear and identify with. But once I started doing all that weird shit—I'm not mad at it because it got everyone's attention." Robby Seabrook III of XXL included Minaj in list of "most unique flows from rappers over the last five years", saying that she "has solidified her spot as a leader of the pack for her animated flows, inspiring many other women in hip-hop to play with their vocals. She goes from campy to bellicose, excited to eccentric, oftentimes all on one song."

Noted as a rap artist, she also occasionally lends herself to electronic music genres (especially electropop). Pink Friday marked her exploration of the genres, spawning electro songs including the pop-laden "Super Bass". Also combining rap with synthesizer music, Minaj's second album, Pink Friday Roman Reloaded, had a number of electro-hop and electro pop songs: "HOV Lane", "Whip It", "Automatic", "Come on a Cone", "Young Forever", "Fire Burns", "Roman Holiday", "The Boys" and "Beez in the Trap"; while "Starships" is a eurodance song.

Her verse on Kanye West's "Monster" was critically acclaimed and contributed greatly to her popularity; many critics said she had the best verse in the song. West claimed at one point he considered deleting her verse from the track, because he was worried it would outshine his own work:

It was like that moment when I thought about taking Nicki's verse off of 'Monster' because I knew people would say that was the best verse on the best Hip Hop album of all time or arguably top ten albums of all time. And I would do all that work, eight months of work on Dark Fantasy and people to this day would say to me 'My favorite thing was Nicki Minaj's verse'. So if I let my ego get the best of me instead of letting that girl get the shot to get that platform to be all she could be, I would take it off or marginalize her, try to stop her from having that shining moment… 

Tara Colley of The Conversation described Minaj as a "pre-eminent female rapper" and that she has "consistently straddled the distinct personas of gangsta boss and sexy pop siren without truly committing to either" and that "her chameleonic ability" matches "some of rap's most verbose, witty, filthy and pop-friendly" stars such as Eminem and Lil Wayne. Zoe Johnson of XXL, stated that in recent years Minaj's "beat selection has moved to refined production full of grit and hip-hop flare in recent years".

Alter egos 

With her parents frequently fighting during her childhood, Minaj lived through characters she created as a means of escape. She recalled that "fantasy was my reality" and her first identity was Cookie, who became Harajuku Barbie and (later) Nicki Minaj. In November 2010, Minaj assumed the alter ego Nicki Teresa, wearing a colorful headdress and calling herself "healer to her fans" during a visit to the Garden of Dreams Foundation at Fuse Studios in New York. She introduced another alter ego, Rosa (pronounced with an exaggerated R), to commemorate her December 2010 appearance on Lopez Tonight.

One of Minaj's most well-known alter-egos is "a demon inside her" named Roman Zolanski (named after film director Roman Polanski with modified surname), Minaj's "twin brother", whose character she assumes when she is angry. Roman has been compared to Eminem's alter ego Slim Shady, and on "Roman's Revenge" Minaj and Eminem collaborate as their alter egos. On her next album, she said that there would be a lot of Roman: "And if you're not familiar with Roman, then you will be familiar with him very soon. He's the boy that lives inside of me. He's a lunatic and he's gay and he'll be on there a lot." Roman has a mother, Martha Zolanski, who appeared on "Roman's Revenge" with a British accent and singing on "Roman Holiday" for the first time. Martha appeared in the "Moment 4 Life" video as Minaj's apparent fairy godmother.

Influences 

Minaj cites Lil Wayne, Foxy Brown, and Jay-Z as major influences: "I can't even imagine my career, um, my creative spirit without Wayne. [...] I feel like I'm still intertwined with him creatively." Minaj has called Lil Wayne her mentor and credited him with discovering her. On Foxy Brown and Jay-Z, Minaj said: "I really loved [Foxy] as a female rapper. I was really interested in her mind and her aura [and] I was really, really into Jay-Z. Me and my friends in high school, we were reciting all of the Jay lyrics. His words were our words in our conversations all the time." 

She said, further: "I never really told Foxy how much she has influenced me and how much she changed my life" adding that Foxy Brown was "the most influential female rapper" for her. Minaj said in a T Magazine interview in 2017: "Jay-Z, Lil Wayne, Foxy Brown... [...] Those are the three I keep in my head when I'm writing because they've influenced me so much, [...] I feel like I'm a part of all of them."

Jada Pinkett Smith is one of Minaj's role models in her acting career. Minaj was inspired by R&B singer Monica, singing "Why I Love You So Much" at every talent show she entered. While performing in Atlanta as part of her Pink Friday Tour, she called Monica one of her all-time greatest musical influences. Lauryn Hill is also one of Minaj's major influences, with Minaj quoting her lyrics in a high school yearbook. Minaj has also cited Madonna, Enya, Eminem, Beyoncé, Kanye West, Trina, Drake, Remy Ma, and Lil' Kim as influences.

She called Betsey Johnson a fashion inspiration: "[Betsey] is a free spirit. When I met her the other day, I felt like I knew her for my whole life. She's so warm and considerate and caring. She's amazingly talented and I've been wearing her clothes forever, so to meet her was like, 'Yay!' [I was] bowing down to her; she's dope!" Minaj has also expressed appreciation for Cyndi Lauper's style and how her videos inspired her as a teenager: "When I first went to get my hair colored, I was about 14 and I wanted blonde highlights. The beautician said, 'No, you have to get your mother on the phone,' and I was just crying and begging. I've always been experimenting. Cyndi Lauper's videos – that's what intrigued me."

Public image 

Billboard listed Minaj the fourth-most-active musician on social media on its March 2011 Social 50 chart. Minaj is also the most followed rapper on Instagram with over 200 million followers, the first to surpass that number, as well as one of the most followed female musicians on the social media platform. On Twitter, she is one of the most followed rappers, with over 26 million followers on the app, as of September 2022. She joined American Idol as a judge in 2013. BET has named Minaj as a "gay icon". Minaj was a vocal proponent of streams counting towards an artist's RIAA certifications. The organization later announced in 2016 that it would be modernizing the certification process for albums, including on-demand audio and video streams, as reported by Yahoo! News.

Minaj has been called as a "fashion icon" by Allure, Time, XXL and has been called a "camp style icon" by Refinery29. She has cited Alexander McQueen, Gianni Versace, and Christian Louboutin as her favorite designers. The Huffington Post described her style as "risk-taking" and "far-out", with "bold sartorial choices"; Minaj has been included on the annual Maxim Hot 100 list several times. In 2014, Minaj underwent a reinvention in her image sporting a "natural" and "softer" look, wearing fewer wigs and less colourful costumes. She stated that she "went so far to the other side that there's only one place to go from there. You can either continue doing costumes or you can just say, "Hey guess what? This will shock them even more. Doing nothing will shock them even more"".

Her physique, notably her buttocks, has attracted significant attention from the media. Early in her career, she made autographing breasts part of her movement to empower women. In 2010, she said that although she originally felt obligated to mimic the provocative behavior of the "female rappers of [her] day", she intended to subdue her sexuality because she "[wants] people—especially young girls—to know that in life, nothing is going to be based on sex appeal. You've got to have something else to go with that."

Minaj talked about feminism in an interview with Vogue in 2015, saying "There are things that I do that feminists don't like, and there are things that I do that they do like. I don't label myself. I just say the truth about what I feel. I feel like women can do anything that they put their minds to." In 2018, an interview with Elle, in which she discussed sex workers, her own sex appeal, and sexuality in music and on social media, attracted criticism. In The New York Times Magazine, music critic Vanessa Grigoriadis said that Minaj "has become expert at modelling the ways that women can wield power in the industry. But she has also drawn attention to the ways in which power can be embodied by a woman standing up for herself and speaking her own mind."

The cover art and music video for her 2014 single, "Anaconda", attracted significant media attention upon release. The music video was viewed 19.6 million times in its first 24 hours of release. The Guardian called the video "racy" but noted that she "doesn't shy from ruffling her audience's feathers", while others praised Minaj for "owning her sexuality", examining her work through a feminist perspective. Another writer for The Guardian said, of the "Anaconda" video, Minaj turns "the classic song into a conversation, and [refuses] to let the camera objectify her lap dance by keeping it zoomed out, at a distance."

Minaj's fanbase, known as the "Barbz", have been reported as often being militant towards Minaj's critics, including incidents reportedly involving cyberbullying and death threats.

Philanthropy 

In 2010, Minaj performed a cover of "Girls Just Wanna Have Fun", alongside singer Katy Perry, for service members during the 2010 VH1 Divas Salute the Troops concert. The two would later collaborate in 2017 on "Swish Swish". In 2011, Mattel created a Barbie doll with Minaj's likeness to auction for Project Angel Food, a charity that provides food for people afflicted with HIV and AIDS. In 2012, in the aftermath of Hurricane Sandy, Minaj donated $15,000 to the Food Bank For New York City and held a turkey drive at her alma mater, PS 45.

In May 2017, Minaj offered via Twitter to pay college tuition fees and student loans for 30 of her fans. She appeared to grant their requests, ranging from $500 to school supplies to $6,000 for tuition, promising to respond to more requests in a month or two. She also announced that she would launch an official charity for student loans and tuition payments in the near future. In the same month, Minaj revealed on Instagram that she has been donating money to a village in India for a few years via her pastor, Lydia Sloley. These donations helped the village get a computer center, a tailoring institute, a reading program, and two water wells. "This is the kind of thing that makes me feel the most proud", she said about the new additions to the village.

In August 2017, after Hurricane Harvey hit the city of Houston, Texas, Minaj answered a social media challenge by comedian and actor Kevin Hart and donated $25,000 to the Red Cross, saying she was "praying for everyone there". On September 4, 2018, Minaj appeared as a guest and performed several songs on The Ellen DeGeneres Show. Throughout the episode, Minaj and Degeneres, with the participation of Walmart, gave out over $150,000 in donations to fans. In 2019, Minaj pulled out of headlining a concert in Saudi Arabia following online backlash from activists, after women's rights activist Loujain al-Hathloul, was detained and arrested for speaking out against the Saudi regime. Minaj was praised by Thor Halvorssen of The Human Rights Foundation, who criticized her initial plan to perform in a letter, and released a statement saying, "After careful reflection ... I believe it is important for me to make clear my support for the rights of women, the LGBTQ community and freedom of expression."

In 2020, Minaj donated $25,000 to the St. Jude's Home for Girls school after visiting the school in her native country of Trinidad. In a speech, Minaj encouraged the girls to push through hard obstacles, even referencing her own experience with domestic violence: "I've experienced being in a home with domestic violence. I've experienced, you know, being at a very difficult crossroads in my life as a teenager. And sometimes as a teenager when things happen, you feel like there's no up from there." In the same year, following the release of Minaj and 6ix9ine's collaboration, "Trollz", Minaj announced that a portion of the proceeds from the song, along with profits from all merchandise, will go towards the Bail Project amid the Black Lives Matter protests sparked by the murder of George Floyd.

Legacy 

Various media outlets, such as Billboard, Time, NME, Rolling Stone, NBC News and Cosmopolitan, have referred to Minaj as the "Queen of Rap" and The New York Times, The Washington Post, NPR, and The Los Angeles Times have referred to her as the "Queen of Hip Hop". Several media outlets, including The New York Times, Evening Standard, and Nylon, have also called her one of the most influential rappers. Billboard and Vibe ranked her as the seventh greatest rapper of all time.

In 2012, Jon Caramanica of The New York Times called Minaj "the most influential female rapper of all time", and in 2015 Vanessa Grigoriadis from its magazine called her "the world's biggest female rap superstar". In Evening Standard, Jochan Embley called her one of the most influential rap artists of all time, saying that "Everything she does is bold, fearless and distinct – whether that be her eye-popping stage attire or her expertly delivered lyrics, which stare gender and race dead in the eye." Zoe Johnson from XXL called her "one of the most versatile MCs" and that she has "made millions off upbeat pop hits and traditional hip-hop sounds that cater to both her femininity and her assertive side".

For NPR Music, Sowmya Krishnamurthy noted that Minaj has portrayed "the quirky, life-size Barbie, glamorous vixen and girl-next-door", arguing that she "changed the landscape for artists in hip-hop for the past decade" with said alter egos. In 2017, Patrik Sandberg of Dazed argued that Minaj has "surpassed every other female hip hop artist to become the most successful in history" in 2017. In 2020, Nick Soulsby of PopMatters called her the "best female rapper and the best rapper of the past ten years – no gender preposition required." Glamour included Minaj in their list of 104 women who defined 2010s pop culture.

In XXL, Madeline Roth commented that Minaj "has helped birth a new generation of rappers that mimic her style". She has influenced several artists, including Tinashe, Cher Lloyd, Cupcakke, Billie Eilish, Lil Nas X, Ms Banks, Asian Doll, Doja Cat, Megan Thee Stallion, Latto, Shenseea, BIA, Lakeyah, Luísa Sonza, Coi Leray, Maliibu Miitch, City Girls, Baby Tate, Ice Spice, Rico Nasty, Flo Milli, Ivorian Doll, Angel Haze, Rubi Rose, and Saweetie. Billboard credited her for bringing female rap back to the mainstream in the US. With over 140 features, the magazine has called Minaj a "rap and pop icon" adding that "she's been one of popular music's most reliable guest performers, notching dozens of chart hits as a supporting presence on other artists' singles." Minaj has been credited by Complex for being able to "take a simple song and turn it into a smash hit just because she's featured on it." In 2012, Caramanica in The New York Times said that:Minaj "became a nimble, evocative rapper. She became an intricate lyricist. She became a thoughtful singer. She became a risky performer. She invented new personae. More than any other rapper in the mainstream, she pushed hard against expectations ... with no one around to compare herself to, or for others to compare her to, she became her own watermark."

In 2014, NPRs Erik Nielson said that Minaj's "success over the last decade has stood as an exception to the unwritten rule that women rappers no longer have a place among elite artists". Nylon writer, Demicia Inman, also credited Minaj for her influence which "stands as one of the most successful rappers of the millennium", also going on to say that Minaj "battled misogyny and industry bias against black women to carve her own identity and sound" thus impacting her career. Complex also commented that, "From her bold outfits to her multi-colored wigs, Minaj oozed confidence that inspired others who were watching closely... [she] doesn't need anything but her art to speak for itself".

Achievements 

Minaj is the recipient of numerous accolades, including eight American Music Awards, twelve BET Awards, seven BET Hip Hop Awards, four Billboard Music Awards, five MTV Video Music Awards, six MTV Europe Music Awards, two People's Choice Awards, one Soul Train Music Award, and four Teen Choice Awards. Minaj has received a total of 10 Grammy Award nominations. She received her first Grammy nomination in 2010 for Best Rap Performance by a Duo or Group ("My Chick Bad" with Ludacris). In 2012, Minaj received three nominations, including Best New Artist and Best Rap Album (Pink Friday). In 2014, she received her second nomination for Best Rap Album (The Pinkprint). She has won the MTV Video Music Award for Best Hip-Hop Video four times ("Super Bass", "Anaconda", "Chun-Li" and "Do We Have a Problem?") and has won the Best Female Video Award once ("Starships"). Minaj is the first woman to have appeared on the Forbes "Hip Hop Cash Kings" list since its inception in 2007, having made four consecutive appearances between 2011 and 2014.

In 2010, Minaj became the first female solo artist to have seven songs on the Billboard Hot 100 simultaneously, and the first woman to appear on MTV's Annual Hottest MC List since its inception in 2007. In 2011, Minaj was ranked sixth on the Rolling Stone master ranking of the "Kings of Hip Hop" which is based on record sales and social media metrics. She is the only rapper to win the BET Award for Best Female Hip-Hop Artist seven consecutive times. In 2013, Minaj became the most-charted female rapper on the Billboard Hot 100 at the time, with 44 entries, tying Mariah Carey as seventh among women of all genres.

Minaj has twenty-one top 10 singles on the chart, the most for any female rapper, with six of those being solo songs. In 2017, Minaj broke the record for most Hot 100 entries by any female artist, surpassing Aretha Franklin, and in 2018, she became the first female artist to accumulate 100 entries on the Hot 100. She held the mentioned record for most Hot 100 entries by a female artist until it was broken in December 2020 by singer-songwriter Taylor Swift. She is the female artist with the second-most Hot 100 entries, behind Swift. In 2019, Billboard Women in Music awarded her with the Game Changer Award.

In 2019, her collaboration with Karol G, named "Tusa", received two nominations at the Latin Grammys. The song became the longest-running number-one single on the Argentina Hot 100, having spent 25 weeks on the position. In 2020, Minaj become the second female rapper to chart at number one on the Hot 100 more than once with her 6ix9ine collaboration "Trollz". She also became the second female to debut atop the chart since Lauryn Hill in 1998. In the same year, she also was the most streamed female rapper on Spotify. In 2021, the music video for "Anaconda" became the first female rap solo song to reach one billion views on YouTube.

In total, Minaj has eight music videos with more than one billion views across all credits on YouTube, becoming the first female rapper to do so. She is only one of two female artists to have eight music videos reaching more than one billion views, tying with Rihanna . In 2016, she was listed on the Time 100 annual list of the most influential people in the world. She was also featured on one of the physical covers of the issue. Complex ranked her eighth on their list of best rappers of the 2010s, being the only female rapper on the list, and named her "Best Rapper Alive" of 2014.

Other activities

Fragrances 

Minaj has a line of fragrances first launched in September 2012. She partnered with 'Give Back Brands' to introduce her first fragrance, "Pink Friday", which was nominated for three 2013 FiFi Awards for Fragrance of the Year, Best Packaging, and Media Campaign of the Year. A "Pink Friday: Special Edition" was released in April 2013 and a deluxe edition version of the fragrance, titled "Pink Friday: Deluxe Edition", was launched in December 2013.

Her fourth and fifth fragrance line, "Minajesty", was launched in September 2013 followed by a flanker fragrance, "Minajesty: Exotic Edition", which was released exclusively to the Home Shopping Network in June 2014. This was followed by the launch of her sixth fragrance line, "Onika", in September 2014. A year later in 2015, Minaj released "The Pinkprint", her seventh fragrance in support of her third studio album of the same name. In 2016, Minaj launched her eighth fragrance "Trini Girl." In 2018, in support of her fourth studio album, she released her ninth fragrance, "Queen."

Products and endorsements 

Minaj has been affiliated with several manufacturing companies and has endorsed a number of products during her career. She has also stated that she has learned the ins and outs of business so she could do it herself. In November 2010, she teamed up with MAC Cosmetics and launched a lipstick, "Pink 4 Friday", which was sold for four consecutive Fridays to promote her debut studio album Pink Friday. In 2011, Mattel crafted a Barbie doll with the avatar of Minaj, inspired by the rapper's likeness for charity, which she described as a "major moment" in her career. It was auctioned on the Charitybuzz website; proceeds benefited nonprofit Project Angel Food. A spokesperson for Mattel stated that, "Barbie is obviously a pop culture icon [...] and Nicki is a big part of pop culture and also huge within the fashion industry, as well as a big Barbie fan." Matthew Perpetua of Rolling Stone stated that the "Minaj Barbie doll is notable in that the rapper has made Barbie dolls a crucial part of her aesthetic." Minaj helped introduce the Casio TRYX in Times Square, and created a six-piece nail polish collection for OPI Products with colors named after her songs.

In February 2012, Minaj launched her own range of lip products for MAC Cosmetics' Viva Glam. In April 2012, Minaj helped launch the Nokia Lumia 900 in Times Square. The following month, Minaj appeared in television and internet advertisements for Pepsi's "LiveForNow" campaign, which featured a remix of her single "Moment 4 Life". She endorsed the 2012 Viva Glam campaign with Ricky Martinwhich raised $270 million for the Mac AIDS Fundand was the face of the lip product line that year along with him. With designer Jeremy Scott, Minaj signed an endorsement deal with Adidas for the brand's fall and winter 2012 campaign to appear in internet advertisements and commercials for Adidas Originals. Set to her song, "Masquerade", her segment of the advertisement was filmed in Brooklyn and also featured Big Sean, Derrick Rose, Sky Ferreira and 2NE1 in other locations worldwide. She fronted the Viva Glam spring campaign by herself, which also introduced her limited-edition lip product collection, "Nicki 2", which was launched in early 2013.

In February 2013, Minaj starred in Bluewater Comics' Fame biographical-comic series, with her comic book, titled Fame: Nicki Minaj. She partnered with Beats Electronics to introduce her "Pink Pill" speakers in April 2013, appearing with DeRay Davis in a commercial for the speakers that same month. She introduced her lifestyle product line, "The Nicki Minaj Collection" for Kmart, composed of clothing, accessories and houseware. In June 2013, Minaj and Mona Scott-Young launched MYX Fusions, a line of fruit-infused, single serve moscato wine beveragelater expanding to sangria, rose, and chardonnayof which Minaj is a co-owner, creative director, and brand ambassador.

Throughout 2014, Minaj released spring, summer, and fall clothing collections for Kmart. Minaj served as the face of Roberto Cavalli's spring and summer campaign of that year.
In March 2015, it was announced that Minaj was a co-owner of the music streaming service Tidal. The service specializes in lossless audio and high definition music videos. In addition to Minaj and company owner Jay Z, sixteen stakeholders including Beyoncé, Madonna, Rihanna, and Kanye West own a 3% equity stake in the service. In November 2015, Minaj released a holiday capsule clothing collection for Kmart and its affiliated e-commerce platform, ShopYourWay. She released a limited edition couture collection for the retailer, which was also available at her website.

In September 2017, she released a duo of lipsticks, called "Nicki's Nude" and "The Pinkprint" (named after her third studio album) in collaboration with MAC Cosmetics. In November 2017, she starred in H&M's holiday campaign along with Anna Ewers, Mariacarla Boscono, Jesse Williams, Charlee Fraser, and Elibeidy Dani. In August 2018, Minaj starred in the trailer for EA Sports' Madden NFL 19 video game alongside Lil Dicky, Quavo and other celebrities. In November 2018, she co-starred with Quavo and Saturday Night Live member Chris Redd in the video game's holiday advertisement campaign.

In 2019, Minaj announced a collaboration with luxury fashion house Fendi, whose chief executive officer Serge Brunschwig stated the brand "shares great affinity with her. [Minaj represents] the fun aspect of the brand", and that the collaboration "made sense [...] [Minaj would] present it extremely well." Minaj's capsule collection with the brand, titled "Fendi Prints On"inspired by the lyric with the same words on Minaj's 2018 single, "Chun-Li"was officially announced in September that year, and was released on October 14, 2019. In March 2022, Minaj fronted the campaign for the "Heaven" Spring 2022 collection by Marc Jacobs.

COVID-19 vaccine controversy 

In September 2021, Minaj announced she would not be attending the 2021 Met Gala due to the COVID-19 vaccine requirement. She stated that she has avoided public appearances and traveling after contracting the virus herself and having to quarantine from her son as a result. She shared several tweets about her unvaccinated status and claimed she wanted to do more research and be comfortable with her decision first. She alleged in a Tweet that her cousin's friend in Trinidad suffered swollen testicles and became impotent as a result of the vaccine. These tweets received backlash where her story about her cousin's friend became the subject of jokes and memes. Trinidad and Tobago health minister Terrence Deyalsingh declared that her claims were false and that no such report existed.

Shortly after, Minaj recommended other people get the vaccine and set up a Twitter poll on COVID-19 vaccine brands. She tweeted that she was sure she would get vaccinated herself because of touring. The White House offered her a phone call with a doctor to answer questions about the safety of the vaccine. In an Instagram Live response two days later, she claimed that she was simply asking questions and she did not give any facts about the vaccine. Minaj alleged that reporters harassed her family for a story, with her sharing some text messages she alleged were harassment on social media. In May 2022, Olivia Truffaut-Wong of The Cut alleged that Minaj had gotten vaccinated, as the 2022 Met Gala (which Minaj attended) requires proof of vaccination and a negative COVID-19 PCR test to attend.

Discography 

Studio albums

 Pink Friday (2010)
 Pink Friday: Roman Reloaded (2012)
 The Pinkprint (2014)
 Queen (2018)

Filmography 

 Ice Age: Continental Drift (2012)
 The Other Woman (2014)
 Barbershop: The Next Cut (2016)
 The Angry Birds Movie 2 (2019)

Tours

Headlining 

 Pink Friday Tour (2012)
 Pink Friday: Reloaded Tour (2012)
 The Pinkprint Tour (2015–16)

Co-headlining 

 The Nicki Wrld Tour (2019)

Opening act 

 Lil Wayne – America's Most Wanted Tour (2008)
 Lil Wayne – I Am Music II Tour (2011)
 Britney Spears – Femme Fatale Tour (2011)

See also 

 List of Trinidadians
 Music of Trinidad and Tobago
 East Coast hip hop
 Honorific nicknames in popular music
 List of most-followed Instagram accounts
 List of best-selling music artists
 List of best-selling female music artists

Notes

References

Further reading

External links 

 
 
 
 

 
1982 births
Living people
21st-century Trinidad and Tobago women singers
21st-century Trinidad and Tobago singers
21st-century women rappers
Actresses from New York City
Businesspeople from Queens, New York
Hardcore hip hop artists
Female models from New York (state)
Feminist musicians
Fiorello H. LaGuardia High School alumni
Hip hop models
Judges in American reality television series
MTV Europe Music Award winners
People from Jamaica, Queens
People from Port of Spain
Pop rappers
Rappers from New York City
Trinidad and Tobago emigrants to the United States
Trinidad and Tobago female models
Trinidad and Tobago people of Dougla descent
Trinidad and Tobago singer-songwriters
Universal Motown Records artists
Young Money Entertainment artists